Micropholis maguirei is a species of plant in the family Sapotaceae. It is found in Brazil and Venezuela.

References

maguirei
Near threatened plants
Taxonomy articles created by Polbot
Taxa named by André Aubréville